The Heiress is a 1949 American romantic drama film directed and produced by William Wyler, from a screenplay written by Ruth and Augustus Goetz, adapted from their 1947 stage play of the same title, which was itself adapted from Henry James' 1880 novel Washington Square. The film stars Olivia de Havilland as Catherine Sloper, a naive young woman who falls in love with a handsome young man despite the objections of her emotionally abusive father who suspects the man of being a fortune hunter. Montgomery Clift stars as Morris Townsend, and Ralph Richardson as Dr. Sloper.

The Heiress premiered in Los Angeles on October 6, 1949 and was theatrically released by Paramount Pictures on December 28, 1949. Although a box office failure, grossing $2.3 million on a $2.6 million budget, the film garnered critical acclaim, with reviewers praising Wyler's direction, its screenplay and the performances of the cast. The film received a leading eight nominations at the 22nd Academy Awards, including for the Best Picture, and won four awards (more than any other film nominated that year); Best Actress (for de Havilland), Best Original Score, Best Production Design, and Best Costume Design.

In 1996, The Heiress was selected for preservation in the United States National Film Registry by the Library of Congress as being "culturally, historically, or aesthetically significant".

Universal Pictures, through its EMKA division, currently handles distribution of the film.

Plot
In New York City in 1849, Catherine Sloper, a plain and chronically shy young woman, lives with her wealthy father, Dr Austin Sloper, in the prestigious Washington Square. The gauche and socially awkward Catherine is secretly a disappointment to her father; he compares her unfavourably to her deceased mother, who was charming, beautiful and talented. Catherine's gregarious Aunt Lavinia Penniman has moved into the household after becoming widowed, and Dr Sloper suggests that she might help Catherine to acquire some social graces. 

When Catherine meets the handsome Morris Townsend at a ball, he sweeps her off her feet with his ardent courtship, encouraged by her aunt. Catherine falls madly in love with Morris and accepts his proposal of marriage after knowing him only a few weeks. Aunt Penniman, a born romantic, is delighted, but Dr. Sloper is sceptical as he believes that Morris, who squandered his own inheritance and has few prospects, only wishes to get his hands on the sizeable fortune Catherine will acquire on her father’s death.

Dr Sloper arranges a meeting with Morris’s sister, a widow with small children who lives in straightened circumstances, but a frank discussion with her only confirms Dr Sloper's opinion of Morris as a fortune hunter. Later that morning, when Morris arrives to formally request Catherine’s hand in marriage, the doctor refuses.

Catherine is greatly distressed by her father’s attitude, but as she already has $10,000 a year (inherited from her mother) she says that she and Morris can still afford to marry and live comfortably. Her father tells her that she may do as she pleases, but if she marries without his approval she will forfeit her inheritance from him. However Morris persuades Catherine that it would not be right to marry without Dr Sloper’s blessing. It is agreed that the doctor will take Catherine abroad for six months, and if she and Morris still wish to marry at the end of that period, he will not stand in their way. But the doctor is privately hoping that the enforced separation will end their romance. 

While Dr Sloper and Catherine are touring Europe, Morris pays regular visits to their house, encouraged by Aunt Penniman. They make a plan, whereby Morris will elope with Catherine when she returns. However, on the travellers’ return to New York, Dr Sloper is not best pleased when he discovers that Morris has been treating his home “like his club” and helping himself to the doctor’s brandy and cigars. He sneers at Catherine’s continued attachment to the young man, telling her that she is so lacking in charm or accomplishments that the only reason Morris could possibly want her is for her money. Catherine, who has never heard her father talk to her like this, is deeply hurt when confronted with his true opinion of her. 

After Dr Sloper has left the room Catherine sees Morris outside, waiting for her in the pouring rain, and she runs out to him delightedly. As the lovers embrace, Morris tells her of his elopement plan, which is for the following night. But Catherine begs him to take her away that very night. He agrees, but tells Catherine she must leave a letter for her father, so that he will forgive them. However Catherine refuses; she says she has learned that her father despises her and even if he were prepared to forgive her, she would not forgive him. She tells her lover that they must not expect a penny from her father. At this, Morris’s ardour cools slightly, but Catherine does not notice. They part, having agreed that Morris will pick her up at 12.30 am that night. 

At the appointed time, Catherine is waiting with her bags packed. Her Aunt Penniman offers to wait with her. But when she learns that Catherine has split from her father - and furthermore has told Morris that she will be disinherited - her aunt is dismayed. As time passes and Morris does not arrive, Catherine becomes agitated. She is eventually forced to accept that, after discovering that she will not inherit her father’s money, Morris has jilted her. 

Soon afterwards, Dr Sloper reveals he is dying. He believes Catherine has rejected Morris and is proud of her, but then learns that it is Morris who has left Catherine. They have a bitter argument and the doctor threatens to change his Will, but can’t bring himself to do it, as he doesn’t wish to disinherit his only child. Catherine refuses to reconcile with her father before he dies. 

A few years later, Catherine is still living in the house in Washington Square with her aunt. One day the aunt comes home with news; she has met Morris Townsend, recently returned from California. 
When Morris visits the house, at Aunt Penniman’s suggestion, Catherine initially refuses to see him, but then changes her mind. Morris has apparently fallen on hard times, and is destitute, but he still tries to win Catherine back. Catherine agrees that she will leave with him that night to be married. But after he has gone home to pack, she sneers at his declarations of love, finally seeing him for the mercenary liar that he always was. That night, when Morris returns for her, Catherine exacts her revenge for his greed and selfishness by refusing to let him in, and leaves him pounding helplessly on the door as she turns off the lights and goes to bed.

Cast

 Olivia de Havilland as Catherine Sloper
 Montgomery Clift as Morris Townsend
 Ralph Richardson as Dr. Austin Sloper
 Miriam Hopkins as Lavinia Penniman
 Vanessa Brown as Maria
 Betty Linley as Mrs. Montgomery
 Ray Collins as Jefferson Almond
 Mona Freeman as Marian Almond
 Selena Royle as Elizabeth Almond
 Paul Lees as Arthur Townsend
 Harry Antrim as Mr. Abeel
 Russ Conway as Quintus
 David Thursby as Geier

Production
After seeing The Heiress on Broadway, Olivia de Havilland approached William Wyler about directing her in a screen adaptation of the play. He agreed and encouraged executives at Paramount Pictures to purchase the rights from the playwrights (Ruth and Augustus Goetz) for $250,000 and offer them $10,000 per week to write the screenplay. The couple were asked to make Morris less of a villain than he was in their play and the original novel in deference to the studio's desire to capitalize on Montgomery Clift's reputation as a romantic leading man.

The film premiered at Radio City Music Hall in New York City on October 6, 1949.

Ralph Richardson reprised the role of Austin Sloper in a London production of the play.

Reception
The Heiress received universal critical acclaim. Bosley Crowther for The New York Times  wrote that the film "crackles with allusive life and fire in its tender and agonized telling of an extraordinarily characterful tale" and added Wyler "has given this somewhat austere drama an absorbing intimacy and a warming illusion of nearness that it did not have on the stage. He has brought the full-bodied people very closely and vividly to view, while maintaining the clarity and sharpness of their personalities, their emotions and their styles...The Heiress is one of the handsome, intense and adult dramas of the year."

The Brooklyn Eagle found the film "an intensely satisfying drama that holds a high level of interest throughout, building relentlessly to a moving climax." Praise for the principals lauded de Havilland especially: "the transformation of Catherine Sloper from a pathetically shy girl to a cold, handsome woman" being "handled with finished skill."

The Philadelphia Inquirer praised the Goetzes for a skillful transformation of their stage version, finding it "in almost every way...superior." Prospects of an Academy Award for de Havilland were judged "thoroughly reasonable" as well.

TV Guide rates the film five out of a possible five stars and adds, "This powerful and compelling drama...owes its triumph to the deft hand of director William Wyler and a remarkable lead performance by Olivia de Havilland.

Time Out London calls the film "typically plush, painstaking and cold...highly professional and heartless."

Channel 4 stated "de Havilland's portrayal...is spine-chilling...Clift brings a subtle ambiguity to one of his least interesting roles, and Richardson is also excellent."

In popular culture
In 1975, the twenty-first episode of the eighth season of The Carol Burnett Show featured a take-off of the film titled "The Lady Heir", with Carol Burnett as Catherine and Roddy McDowell as Morris.

The film's Philippine adaptation, titled Ikaw Pa Lang ang Minahal, was made in 1992. The adaptation was written by Raquel Villavicencio, produced by Armida Siguion-Reyna, and directed by Carlos Siguion-Reyna. The film stars Maricel Soriano and Richard Gomez as Adela and David.

Awards and nominations

See also

 Gothic romance film

References

External links

 
 
 
 
 
The Heiress: A Cruel Inheritance an essay by Pamela Hutchinson at the Criterion Collection
The Heiress essay by Daniel Eagan in America's Film Legacy: The Authoritative Guide to the Landmark Movies in the National Film Registry, A&C Black, 2010 , pages 426-427 

1949 films
1940s historical drama films
American historical drama films
American black-and-white films
Films based on American novels
American films based on plays
Films based on works by Henry James
Films set in the 19th century
Films set in New York City
Films featuring a Best Actress Academy Award-winning performance
Films featuring a Best Drama Actress Golden Globe-winning performance
Films whose art director won the Best Art Direction Academy Award
Films that won the Best Original Score Academy Award
Films that won the Best Costume Design Academy Award
Paramount Pictures films
Films directed by William Wyler
Films scored by Aaron Copland
United States National Film Registry films
Films based on adaptations
1949 drama films
1940s English-language films
1940s American films